Newbury could be either of the following places in the U.S. state of Vermont:

Newbury (town), Vermont
Newbury (village), Vermont, within the town of Newbury